The second season of the Australian drama Sea Patrol premiered on the Nine Network on 31 March 2008 and aired on Monday nights at 8:30 PM. The thirteen-episode season ended on 23 June 2008.

The season introduced a new patrol boat, following the decommissioning of the original,  boat in the final scenes of season one. The second season also featured the debut of a new main character, Able Seaman Rebecca "Bomber" Brown, as the boat's new cook.

Though advertised by the Nine Network as Sea Patrol II: The Coup, episodes themselves bore no title other than Sea Patrol, and the ISAN number indicated that the episodes were merely episodes 14–26 of Sea Patrol.

Continuing the format from the first season, episodes generally moved a season-long story arc along.  As the Nine Network marketing indicated, this arc involved a coup on the Samaru Islands, a fictional island nation close to Australia. In many ways, the story was evocative of Operation ANODE, a peacekeeping mission to the Solomon Islands that has been called "the [operational] pinnacle for the Fremantle class" by the Australian Department of Defence.

Casting

Main cast

Recurring cast

Main plot 
The season-long story arc revolved around a political conflict in the fictional Samaru Islands, which was ultimately shown to be located approximately due east of Cairns. Starting somewhere during a political campaign to elect the nation's president, the season ended literally on the day of the election. Throughout the season, the crew of Hammersley encountered an increasing number of clues that someone was using the waters off northeast Queensland to stage a paramilitary coup of the sitting Samaran government.  Ultimately, it became clear that someone meant to stop the impending election from proceeding according to the will of voters.  Over the course of the season, Australian businessman, Ray Walsman – an apparent victim of the anti-government forces in the premiere episode – emerged as the leader of the insurgency.   His aim was to secure lucrative mining rights from the government which would have been formed had the coup succeeded.

In the season opener, the writers allowed one of the characters to directly reference the real-life events that inspired the story line.  Following an initial rescue mission to the Samaru Islands in "The Dogs of War", Hammersleys captain tells his department heads that the Australian government has finalised a peacekeeping arrangement with the Samaran government, and that return visits are therefore likely. Charge says, "Great.  That'd be the Solomons all over again."

Ongoing subplots 
All main characters had at least one subplot which appeared in more than one episode.  Among them were:  Nav and ET's increasing problems in keeping their romantic relationship a secret, Bomber's anger-management issues, Spider's relationship with Carly Walsman, the negative impact of a naval career on Swain's marriage, the differing ways in which Buffer and Charge dealt with near-death experiences, Kate's relationship with SAS officer Jim Roth, Mike's struggle to choose the best way to advance his career, and ROs continued social isolation from his shipmates..

Production 

The season was filmed on the Royal Australian Navy's new . 42 days of the filming schedule were spent aboard , with pickup shooting later performed aboard . The remainder of the 86 days of filming were at studios, and on location at the Gold Coast, Queensland.

Reception

Storylines controversies 
The series caused controversy among some officers of the Royal Australian Navy when they came to believe that "its raunchy storylines" were "making a mockery of the navy". Controversy was caused when, in some episodes, there were hints of romance between RAN officers and seamen. These were said to make a mockery of the navy's strict non-fraterisation policy.

Some controversy was also caused with the storylines of the second season of Sea Patrol which feature a political coup in the fictional islands of Samaru. While some critics embraced the new storylines of the show, some were worried that "It's a tricky business when TV dramas stray into real-world politics".

Critical response 

Reviews of the season were mixed.  One reviewer said that the show had learned from its mistakes of "simplicity and stiffness" during its freshman season to deliver a season whose "most striking aspect" was its "naturalness".

Another reviewer recommended the season to his readers as an overall improvement on the first, especially praising the dramatic possibilities inherent in the bigger Armidale-class bridge and the "more contemporary, plot-driven" story arc.  But he still highlighted areas of possible improvement.  Making the point that the show's dependence on the Australian Navy sometimes made it difficult for the show to indulge in interesting usage of dramatic license, he said that "McElroy All Media appears to have taken a "steady as she goes" approach to change rather than taking hold of the wheel and firmly jumping the shark with a tougher, grittier tone."

Ratings
Ratings for this season successfully reversed the trend of the first season.  Whereas the first year had been plagued by a generally downward trend, season two was characterised by gradually improving ratings.  Only the Brisbane region exhibited a strong fall-off of viewers in the season's final weeks.  Although no episode of the season scored as highly as season one's first week, the final five weeks held steady at 1.5 million viewers nationally.  The last two episodes of the season gained well over half a million more viewers over the last two installments of season one.

Episodes
{| class="wikitable plainrowheaders" width="100%" style="margin-right: 0;"
|-
! style="background-color: #FFA000;"| Seriesepisode 
! style="background-color: #FFA000;"| Seasonepisode 
! style="background-color: #FFA000;"| Title
! style="background-color: #FFA000;"| Directed by
! style="background-color: #FFA000;"| Written by
! style="background-color: #FFA000;"| Original air date
! style="background-color: #FFA000;"| Viewers(millions)

|}

DVD release
The second season of Sea Patrol – Sea Patrol II: The Coup – was released on Region 4 DVD on 6 November 2008.

See also

 List of Sea Patrol episodes

References

General references 
 
 
 
 

2008 Australian television seasons
Sea Patrol